Ralph Andrus Loveland (January 17, 1819 in Westport, Essex County, New York – November 9, 1899) was an American politician from New York.

Life
He was the son of Erastus Loveland (1793–1882) and Lucy (Bradley) Loveland (1794–1866).

He was in the transportation business from 1840 to 1853, and then manufactured pig iron until 1856. In 1840, he married Harriet Mehitable Kent (1818–1887), and they had several children.

He entered politics as a Whig, was a delegate to the Anti-Nebraska Party state convention in 1854, and joined the Republican Party upon its foundation. He was Supervisor of the Town of Westport for several terms.

He was a member of the New York State Assembly (Essex Co.) in 1857; and of the New York State Senate (16th D.) in 1858 and 1859.

Later he removed to East Saginaw, Michigan, and became engaged in the lumber trade.

He was buried at the Forest Lawn Cemetery in Saginaw.

Sources
 The New York Civil List compiled by Franklin Benjamin Hough, Stephen C. Hutchins and Edgar Albert Werner (1867; pg. 442 and 483)
 Biographical Sketches of the State Officers and Members of the Legislature of the State of New York in 1859 by William D. Murray (pg. 67ff)
 Loveland genealogy at Thomas Rogers Society

External links

1819 births
1899 deaths
Republican Party New York (state) state senators
People from Westport, New York
Republican Party members of the New York State Assembly
Town supervisors in New York (state)
Politicians from Saginaw, Michigan
19th-century American politicians